Grace United Methodist Church, formerly Grace Methodist Episcopal Church, is a historic Methodist church at 4105 Junius Street in Dallas, Texas.

It was built in 1903 and added to the National Register of Historic Places in 1982.

See also

National Register of Historic Places listings in Dallas County, Texas
List of Dallas Landmarks

References

Churches in Dallas
United Methodist churches in Texas
Churches on the National Register of Historic Places in Texas
National Register of Historic Places in Dallas
Gothic Revival church buildings in Texas
Churches completed in 1903
20th-century Methodist church buildings in the United States
Dallas Landmarks